The Eerie Cold is the fourth album by Shining. It was released on Avantgarde Music in 2005. A black LP version was released, limited to 500 copies. This album was originally intended to be the band's last.

The end of "Claws of Perdition" includes sampled audio from the ending monologue of Christian Bale's character Patrick Bateman in American Psycho.

Track listing

Notes

Personnel
 Niklas Kvarforth - vocals, guitar, keyboard
 John Doe - guitar
 Phil A. Cirone - bass guitar, keyboard
 Hellhammer - drums

References

Shining (Swedish band) albums
Avantgarde Music albums
2005 albums